MENTOR was founded to expand opportunity for young people by building a youth mentoring field and movement in the United States. Since its founding, there has been a more than 10x increase in young people in structured mentoring relationships, from hundreds of thousands to millions.

Impact
By supporting, creating, and elevating research and opportunities, MENTOR is the primary resource and expert for the youth mentoring field, representing a movement that meets young people everywhere they are – from schools, to workplaces, and beyond.  

MENTOR operates the Office of Juvenile Justice and Delinquency Prevention’s National Mentoring Resource Center and provides technical assistance to mentoring programs across the country. MENTOR also helps expand the mentoring movement through the Mentoring Connector, the only national database of mentoring programs that works to pair potential mentors and mentoring programs through. The organization also works to drive equity through initiatives and campaigns such as the Workplace Equity Pledge, Connect|Focus|Grow, and National Mentoring Month.

Recognition
MENTOR is a 501(c)(3) nonprofit organization. MENTOR is a member of the Social Impact 100 (S&I 100 Index) and has a 4-star rating from Charity Navigator, the largest and most-utilized evaluator of charities in the United States. With Affiliates across the country and a National office in Boston, Massachusetts, MENTOR's impact is wide-reaching.

In 2021, MENTOR received a portion of the $2.7 billion that philanthropist MacKenzie Scott gifted “286 Teams Empowering Voices the World Needs to Hear.”

MENTOR co-founders Geoff Boisi and Ray Chambers each received the Lewis Hine Distinguished Service Award from the National Child Labor Committee (NCLC) for a lifetime of outstanding service to children.

See also
Youth mentoring
StudentMentor.org
The Mentoring Partnership of Southwestern Pennsylvania
Boys & Girls Clubs of America
Big Brothers Big Sisters of America

References

External links
 MENTOR official website
 Video of celebrities promoting the need for mentoring.
 Speech by former mentee Ean Garrett April 2008

Alternative education
Non-profit organizations based in Boston
501(c)(3) organizations